Cyperus diamantinus is a species of sedge that is native to south eastern Brazil.

See also 
 List of Cyperus species

References 

diamantinus
Plants described in 2007
Flora of Brazil
Taxa named by Rafaël Govaerts